Tarporley is a large village and civil parish in Cheshire, England. The civil parish also contains the village of Rhuddall Heath. Tarporley is bypassed by the A49 and A51 roads.

At the 2011 census, the population was 2,614.

History
Tarporley is near the site of a prehistoric settlement. Several prehistoric artefacts have been discovered within close proximity of the present-day village: a Neolithic stone axe, a flint scraper and a Bronze Age barbed and tanged arrow head.

It is listed in the Domesday Book as Torpelei, which has been translated as meaning “a pear wood near a hill called Torr”. For this reason, Tarporley Church of England Primary School has a pear tree for its emblem. However, the exact origins and meaning are unclear. The name has also been suggested to mean "a peasant's wood/clearing", derived from the Old English words þorpere (someone who lives at a thorp; a peasant) and lēah (a wood, forest, glade or clearing)

In 1066, the settlement was owned by Wulfgeat of Madeley and was worth one pound. Twenty years later, under the ownership of Gilbert the Hunter (Gilbert de Venables), Tarporley's value had halved, to ten shillings. This small agricultural settlement comprised eight households (four villagers, two smallholders and two slaves). The Domesday entry suggests that Tarporley was one of many townships still recovering from the devastation caused by the Normans' Harrying of the North in 1069–70.

Governance
An electoral ward of the same name exists. This ward stretches north-east to the Budworths with a total population at the 2011 census of 4,398.

Civic history
At Domesday, Tarporley was a township and ancient parish in the Hundred of Rushton, but by the late 12th century it had become part of Eddisbury Hundred. From 1866, the village has had civil parish status and its parish council gives it some limited local government autonomy. The parish council comprises 12 locally elected members.

Tarporley Urban District was created in 1894 and was abolished in 1936. From 1936 until 1974 Tarporley was a part of Northwich Rural District, until that district's abolition as a result of the Local Government Act 1972. From 1 April 1974 Tarporley formed part of the borough of Vale Royal, within Cheshire and was included in the new unitary authority of Cheshire West and Chester on 1 April 2009.

Political representation
Tarporley has been in the parliamentary constituency of Eddisbury since that constituency's re-establishment in 1983, following its abolition in 1950. The constituency has been represented by Conservative MPs since its re-establishment: Edward Timpson (since 2019), Stephen O'Brien (1999–2015) and Antoinette Sandbach (2015–19).

Demography

Geography and transport
Tarporley is bypassed by the A49 and A51 roads. The village was once served by Beeston Castle and Tarporley railway station on the North Wales Coast Line between Crewe and Chester, more than two miles from the village; the line remains open but the station closed in April 1966.

A local bus service, route 84, is provided by Arriva Buses Wales.

Education

Tarporley has two schools: Tarporley High School and Tarporley Church of England Primary School.

Brook Farm School was a state special education boarding school located in the village that closed in 2001 and was demolished in 2013.

Culture
Established in 1983, through The British Council, Tarporley is twinned with the Breton village of Bohars, near Brest, France.

Tarporley Hunt Club, the oldest surviving hunt club in England, meets in the village every Christmas.

A community radio station dedicated to the surrounding towns is currently being set up under the name Radio Tarporley – Tarporley Community Radio.

See also

Listed buildings in Tarporley
St Helen's Church, Tarporley
Portal, Tarporley

References
Notes

External links 

Parish council website

 
Civil parishes in Cheshire
Villages in Cheshire